Alectryon ramiflorus is a species of endangered small seasonal rainforest trees from the plant family Sapindaceae. They are endemic to a very restricted area of southeastern Queensland, Australia. Threats of extinction to the species include habitat loss and disturbance of a catastrophic degree from wildfire or storms.

References

External links

ramiflorus
Endangered flora of Australia
Flora of Queensland
Sapindales of Australia
Vulnerable flora of Australia
Nature Conservation Act endangered biota
Vulnerable biota of Queensland
Endemic flora of Australia
Taxonomy articles created by Polbot
Taxa named by Sally T. Reynolds